Kıznaz Türkeli is a Turkish politician of Azerbaijani origin, who won a seat in the Turkish parliament in June 2015 with the Peoples' Democratic Party from electoral district of Iğdır.

References

Deputies of Iğdır
Living people
People from Iğdır
Turkish people of Azerbaijani descent
Members of the 25th Parliament of Turkey
21st-century Turkish women politicians
Year of birth missing (living people)